María José Sánchez Moreno (born 3 July 2005) is a Mexican diver. She participated at the 2019 World Aquatics Championships, winning a bronze medal.

References

2005 births
Living people
Mexican female divers
World Aquatics Championships medalists in diving
21st-century Mexican women